Paziella oregonia is a species of sea snail, a marine gastropod mollusk in the family Muricidae, the murex snails or rock snails.

Description
The size of an adult shell varies between 40 mm and 90 mm.

Distribution
This marine species is distributed from Colombia to Northern Brazil.

References

 Merle D., Garrigues B. & Pointier J.-P. (2011) Fossil and Recent Muricidae of the world. Part Muricinae. Hackenheim: Conchbooks. 648 pp. page(s): 164

External links
 

Muricidae
Gastropods described in 1964